Chaetosphaerella is a genus of fungi within the Chaetosphaerellaceae family.

References

External links

Sordariomycetes genera
Coronophorales